Amado Carrillo Fuentes (December 17, 1956 – July 4, 1997) was a Mexican drug lord who seized control of the Juárez Cartel after assassinating his boss Rafael Aguilar Guajardo. Amado Carrillo became known as "El Señor de Los Cielos" ("The Lord of the Skies"), because of the large fleet of jets he used to transport drugs. He was also known for laundering money via Colombia, to finance this fleet.

He died in July 1997, in a Mexican hospital, after undergoing extensive plastic surgery to change his appearance. In his final days, Carrillo was being tracked by Mexican and U.S. authorities.

Amado Carrillo Fuentes was assessed to be worth around $25 billion (about $40 billion by the present appraisals) at the hour of death.

Early life 
Carrillo was born to Walter Vicente Carrillo Vega and Aurora Fuentes in Guamuchilito, Navolato, Sinaloa, Mexico. He had eleven siblings.

Carrillo was the nephew of Ernesto Fonseca Carrillo, also known as "Don Neto", the Guadalajara Cartel leader. Amado got his start in the drug business under the tutelage of his uncle Ernesto and later brought in his brothers, and eventually his son Vicente José Carrillo Leyva.

Carrillo's father died in April 1986. Carrillo's brother, Cipriano Carrillo Fuentes, died in 1989 under mysterious circumstances.

Career 
Initially, Carrillo was part of the Guadalajara Cartel, sent to Ojinaga, Chihuahua to oversee the cocaine shipments of his uncle, Ernesto Fonseca Carrillo ("Don Neto"), and to learn about border operations from Pablo Acosta Villarreal ("El Zorro de Ojinaga"; "The Ojinaga Fox") and Rafael Aguilar Guajardo. Later, Carrillo worked with Pablo Escobar and the Cali Cartel smuggling drugs from Colombia to Mexico and the United States. He also worked with "El Chapo" (Joaquin Guzman Loera), the Arellano Felix family, and the Beltran Leyva organization.

During his tenure, Carrillo reportedly built a multibillion-dollar drug empire. It was estimated that he may have made over $25 billion in revenue over the course of his career.

Death 
The pressure to capture Carrillo intensified among U.S. and Mexican authorities after people in Morelos state began silent marches against governor Jorge Carrillo Olea and his presumed complacency with drug-related violence. Carrillo Fuentes owned a house three blocks from the governor's official residence and regularly held narco-fiestas in the municipality of Tetecala. Governor Carrillo Olea was forced to resign and was arrested; this type of pressure may have convinced Carrillo Fuentes to undergo facial plastic surgery and abdominal surgery liposuction to change his appearance on July 4, 1997, at Santa Mónica Hospital in Mexico City. However, during the operation, he died of complications apparently caused either by a certain medication or a malfunctioning respirator (there is very little paperwork regarding his death).

Two of Carrillo Fuentes's bodyguards were in the operating room during the procedure. On November 7, 1997, the two surgeons who performed Carrillo's surgery were found dead, encased in concrete inside steel drums, with their bodies showing signs of torture.

Juárez Cartel after Carrillo 
On the night of August 3, 1997, at around 9:30 p.m., four drug traffickers walked into a restaurant in Ciudad Juárez, pulled out their guns, and opened fire on five diners, killing them instantly. Police estimated that more than 100 bullet casings were found at the crime scene. According to a report issued by the Los Angeles Times, four men went to the restaurant carrying at least two AK-47 automatic rifles while others stood at the doorstep.

On their way out, the gunmen claimed another victim, Armando Olague, a prison official and off-duty law enforcement officer who was gunned down outside the restaurant after he had walked from a nearby bar to investigate the shooting. Reportedly, Olague had run into the restaurant from across the street with a gun in his hand to check out the commotion. It was later determined that Olague was also a known lieutenant of the Juarez Cartel.

Mexican authorities declined to comment on the motives behind the killing, stating the shootout was not linked to Carrillo's death. Nonetheless, it was later stated that the perpetrators were gunmen of the Tijuana Cartel.

Although confrontations between narcotraficantes were common in Ciudad Juárez, they rarely occurred in public places. What happened in the restaurant threatened to usher in a new era of border crime in the city.

In Ciudad Juárez, the Office of the Mexican Attorney-General (PGR) seized warehouses that they believed the cartel used to store weapons and cocaine. They also seized over 60 properties all over Mexico belonging to Carrillo and began an investigation into his dealings with police and government officials. Officials also froze bank accounts amounting to $10 billion belonging to Carrillo.  In April 2009, Mexican authorities arrested Carillo's son, Vicente Carrillo Leyva.

Funeral 
Carrillo was given a large and lavish, expensive funeral in Guamuchilito, Sinaloa. In 2006, Governor Eduardo Bours asked the federal government to tear down Carrillo's mansion in Hermosillo, Sonora.

Media portrayals 
 In second season of TV Series El cartel is portrayed by the Mexican actor Esteban Franco as the character Juan B. Guillén 'El Piloto'.
 In El Chapo (2017), the Netflix and Univision TV series about the life of Joaquín "El Chapo" Guzmán, Carrillo is portrayed by Rodrigo Abed.
 El Señor de los Cielos (2013–), aired as part of Telemundo's nighttime programming, stars the Mexican actor Rafael Amaya as Aurelio Casillas (a fictionalized version of Amado Carrillo Fuentes).
 In the Netflix series Narcos (2017) and Narcos: Mexico (2018–2021), Carrillo is portrayed by José María Yazpik. The series implies Carrillo faked his death in order to survive the drug business and avoid imprisonment.
 In the Netflix series Surviving Escobar (2017), Carrillo is fictionalized as "Señor de los Aires" and portrayed by Mauro Mauad, who also portrayed Amado Carrillo Fuentes in the Fox Premium TV series El General Naranjo (2019)
 In the History Channel mini-series America's War on Drugs (2017), Amado Carrillo Fuentes is portrayed by Tatsu Carvalho
 In the History Latam TV-series Reyes Del Crimen (2018), Amado Carrillo Fuentes is portrayed by Marco Gomez

See also 
 Mérida Initiative
 Mexican Drug War

References

External links 
 Novela El Senor de los Cielos 2 – Telemundo
 Novela El Senor de los Cielos – Telemundo
 Public Broadcasting, information from the Drug Enforcement Administration

1956 births
1997 deaths
Guadalajara Cartel traffickers
Juárez Cartel traffickers
Mexican crime bosses
Mexican money launderers
People from Navolato